Events from the year 1565 in France.

Incumbents 
Monarch – Charles IX

Events
 January 1 – Recognized as the first day of the year by the royal chancellery according to the Edict of Roussillon (1564) article 39.
 September 4 – The Spanish fleet of Pedro Menéndez de Avilés lands in modern-day Florida to oust the French under Jean Ribault. He later destroys the French colony of Fort Caroline.
 Lycée Alexandre Ribot founded in Saint-Omer as a Walloon Jesuit college.

Births
 October 6 – Marie de Gournay, writer (died 1645)

Deaths
 June 12 – Adrianus Turnebus, classical scholar (born 1512)
 September 13 – William Farel, evangelist (born 1489)
 October 12 – Jean Ribault, explorer and colonist (born 1520)
 c. October 22 – Jean Grolier de Servières, bibliophile (born 1479)

See also

References

1560s in France